The 1898–99 Scottish Districts season is a record of all the rugby union matches for Scotland's district teams.

History

Glasgow District beat Edinburgh District in the Inter-City match.

Stevenson for the Anglo-Scots scored the first try on the SRU's new pitch.

Results

Inter-City

Glasgow District: J. G. Couper (West of Scotland), Robert Neilson (West of Scotland), George A.W. Lamond (Kelvinside Academicals), John Tulloch (Kelvinside Academicals), Charles France (Kelvinside Academicals), Bill Donaldson (West of Scotland), John Knox (Kelvinside Academicals), James Couper (West of Scotland), William Thomson (West of Scotland), Gordon Neilson (West of Scotland), John Dykes (Glasgow HSFP), G. Wingate (Kelvinside Academicals), Lawrence Harvey (Greenock Wanderers), J. M. Bell (Clydesdale), Harvey Anderson (Glasgow Academicals)

Edinburgh District: J. Graham (Watsonians), Alf Bucher (Edinburgh Academicals), William Morrison (Edinburgh Academicals), J. D. Little (Watsonians), H. M. Simson (Watsonians), Jimmy Gillespie (Edinburgh Academicals), M. W. Robertson (Watsonians), Bill McEwan (Edinburgh Academicals), W. Dors (Edinburgh Academicals), G. Moncreiff (Edinburgh Academicals), Mark Coxon Morrison (Royal HSFP), Harry Smith (Watsonians), Andrew Balfour (Watsonians), A. Forbes (Watsonians), J. Greig (Edinburgh Wanderers)

Other Scottish matches

Midlands: J. Shepherd (Newport), W. Burrows (Panmure), C. A. Air (Panmure), J. Lockhart (Kirkcaldy), P. Watson (Newport), E. A. Shepherd (Panmure) and T. Longmuir (St Andrews University), T. D. Murray (Panmure), G. F. Whyte (Panmure), D. Meldrum (Dundee HSFP), P. A. Anderson (Dundee HSFP), J. Fullerton (Dundee HSFP), H. E. White (Kirkcaldy), D. L. Barrie (Newport), and T. Gillespie (St Andrews University).

North of Scotland: A. J. Milne (Aberdeen GSFP), J. A. Butchart (Aberdeen GSFP), G. O. Gauld (Aberdeen GSFP), J. Oglivie (Aberdeen GSFP),  J. W. Milne (Aberdeen University) W. B. Butchart (Aberdeen GSFP), W. Y. Hay (Aberdeenshire), W. Pope (Aberdeen GSFP), A. B. Butchart (Aberdeen GSFP), W. Irons (Aberdeenshire) and A. S. Pirie (Aberdeenshire), P. Croll (Aberdeen University), A. M. Cran (Aberdeen University), and W. Alexander (University), H. Barker (Nomads).

South-West Scotland : 

North of Scotland:

Anglo-Scots: W. Wilson (London Scottish), George Campbell (London Scottish), Douglas Monypenny (London Scottish), John Crabbie (Oxford University), William Morrison (Edinburgh Academicals), M. A. Black (Cambridge University), Frank Fasson (Cambridge University), Andrew MacKinnon (London Scottish), F. A. Davidson (London Scottish), T. Gowans (London Scottish), Graham Kerr (Old Dunelmians, Durham), R. C. Stevenson (Northumberland), A. Davidson (Lancashire), A. S. Pringle (Cambridge University), James Greenlees (Cambridge University)

South of Scotland: J. Hogg (Hawick), Dodds (JedForest), J. Scott (Langholm), Oliver (JedForest), Bunyan (Melrose), Joe Mabon (Jedburgh), Brownlie (Jedburgh), B. L. Greig (Jedburgh), J. Stillie (Langholm), D. Elliot (Langholm), Tom Scott (Hawick), J. N. Corrie (Langholm), Mitchell (Selkirk), Carter (Gala), Jeffrey (Jedburgh)

Cities District: 

Provinces District:

English matches

No other District matches played.

International matches

No touring matches this season.

References

1898–99 in Scottish rugby union
Scottish Districts seasons